Barremitinae is a subfamily belonging to the Ammonoidea subclass.

Description 
Whorl section in this group ranges from more or less circular through rectangular to oxyconic.  Ribbing, if present, is weak.  Suture is relatively simple, without markedly retracted suspensive lobe.

This animal lived during the Lower Cretaceous, from Upper Valanginian to Upper Barremian.

Distribution
It has been recorded from Morocco, Spain (Granada, Murcia, Jaén), France (Provence), Italy, Austria, Hungary, Slovakia, Bulgaria, Georgia, Oregon, United States,  Trinidad and Tobago, Japan, and Egypt.

References

External links 
 
 
 
   Barremitinae on Ammonites et autres spirales - Hervé Châtelier
  Barremitinae on Ammonites et autres fossiles - Cyril Baudouin

Cretaceous ammonites
 Ammonites of Europe
Barremian life
Cretaceous Morocco
Fossils of Morocco
Cretaceous France
Fossils of France
Fossils of the United States
Cretaceous Italy
Fossils of Italy
Fossils of Slovakia
Cretaceous Spain
Fossils of Spain
Fossils of Japan